"Roxy Roller" is a song originally recorded by the glam rock band Sweeney Todd in 1975 with Nick Gilder on vocals. It was written by Jim McCulloch and Nick Gilder. In total, four versions of the song were released in 1976:
 the original one at London Records, cat. no. L 2590, released in Canada only, 
 a solo version recorded by Nick Gilder released at Chrysalis Records in various countries outside Canada in 1976,
 a version by Sweeney Todd with newly recorded vocals by new lead singer Clark Perry on London Records, cat. no. 5N-240, released in various countries outside Canada.
 a version by Sweeney Todd with newly recorded vocals by new lead singer Bryan Adams on London Records, cat. no. 5N-244, released in the U.S. only.

Canadian success story

The original version did chart big in Canada, entering during May 1976: the song spent three consecutive weeks at number one in Canada during June and July 1976. By that time Gilder and McCulloch both had already left the band to pursue a solo career.   

The song is ranked as the fifth biggest Canadian hit of 1976.  "Roxy Roller" won a Juno Award for the band.

USA reception

Because the song was not an immediate success with the American public, Gilder took a chance and recorded a solo version. It was released on Chrysalis Records. However, it faced immediate competition from Sweeney Todd's rush-released re-recorded version on which new singer Clark Perry did lead vocals. Acting on Gilder's behalf, Chrysalis Records demanded that imported copies of the Sweeney Todd original, as well as of the newly recorded version, be withdrawn from the US market. Record stores duly removed both versions from their shelves.

However, two re-recorded versions of 'Roxy Roller' did chart on the Billboard Hot 100. The version with vocals by Clark Perry peaked at #90 (and at #97 in the Cash Box Top 100) in late August 1976. A second Sweeney Todd re-recording--with vocals by Bryan Adams--peaked at #99 in mid-September 1976.

With four versions of "Roxy Roller" competing for stateside attention, none achieved either a high chart position or great sales, even though this was an era when the glam rock sound was still quite popular.

Chart history

Weekly charts
Nick Gilder original

Clark Perry re-record

Bryan Adams re-record

Year-end charts
Gilder

Perry

Adams

Cover versions
 "Roxy Roller" was covered by Suzi Quatro in 1977.

 The song was covered by Jaded Past in 2014.

References

External links
  (Clark Perry vocals)
  (Bryan Adams vocals)

1975 songs
1976 singles
1977 singles
Bryan Adams songs
Nick Gilder songs
Songs written by Nick Gilder
London Records singles
RPM Top Singles number-one singles